List of protected species in Hong Kong.

Plants
Protected Species under Forestry Regulations Cap. 96A

Animals
Protected species under Wild Animals Protection Ordinance Cap 170

See also

Environment of Hong Kong

External links
References
Hong Kong Reptile & Amphibian Society
HKNature.net
WWF Hong Kong's responses on review of nature conservation policy (17 October 2003)

Environment of Hong Kong
Biota of Hong Kong
 
 
Protected species